Kovalevskiella  is a genus of Asian plants in the dandelion tribe within the sunflower family.
 
 Species
 Kovalevskiella aitchisoniana (Beauverd) Kamelin - Afghanistan
 Kovalevskiella kovalevskiana (Kirp.) Kamelin - Kazakhstan, Uzbekistan, Kyrgyzstan
 Kovalevskiella zeravschanica (Popov ex Kovalevsk.) Kamelin - Uzbekistan

 formerly included
see Lactuca Mulgedium 
 Kovalevskiella decipiens (Hook.f. & Thomson ex C.B.Clarke) Kamelin - Lactuca decipiens Hook.f. & Thomson ex C.B.Clarke
 Kovalevskiella rapunculoides (DC.) Kamelin - Lactuca rapunculoides  (DC.) C.B.Clarke
 Kovalevskiella rosea (Popov & Vved.) Kamelin -  Mulgedium roseum Popov & Vved.

References 

Cichorieae
Asteraceae genera